Eudokia Baïana (Greek: Εὐδοκία Βαϊανή; died 12 April 901) was a Byzantine empress consort as the third wife of Leo VI the Wise.

Biography 
The work Theophanes Continuatus was a continuation of the chronicle of Theophanes the Confessor by other writers, active during the reign of Constantine VII. The work records the few details known about her.

According to Theophanes, Eudokia came from the Opsician Theme. The Opsician Theme was originally composed of all of Bithynia and Paphlagonia, stretching from Abydos on the Dardanelles to Sinope on the Black Sea and inland to Ancyra. In the 20th century, the lands once belonging to the Theme form most of the northwestern quarter of Asiatic Turkey.

In Spring, 900, Leo VI married Eudokia. His previous two wives had predeceased him. De Ceremoniis by Constantine VII names as many as three daughters born of the previous marriages but no son. Leo wanted to secure his succession by this marriage. George Alexandrovič Ostrogorsky points that a third marriage was technically illegal under Byzantine law and against the practices of the Eastern Orthodox Church at the time. Leo VI had to seek permission by Ecumenical Patriarch Antony II of Constantinople.

A year later Eudokia died while giving birth. Theophanes considers the son stillborn and unnamed. However De Ceremoniis while listing the children of Leo VI names a son called Basil, which might indicate her son survived long enough to be named. De Ceremoniis gives her burial place as the Church of the Holy Apostles in Constantinople.

Sources
Theophanes Continuatus, Chronicle
Constantine VII, De Ceremoniis

See also

List of Byzantine emperors
List of Roman and Byzantine Empresses

References

External links
Her listing along with her husband in "Medieval lands" by Charles Cawley. The project "involves extracting and analysing detailed information from primary sources, including contemporary chronicles, cartularies, necrologies and testaments."

9th-century births
901 deaths
Macedonian dynasty
Deaths in childbirth
9th-century Byzantine empresses
10th-century Byzantine empresses
Burials at the Church of the Holy Apostles